Credaro is a comune (municipality) in the Province of Bergamo in the Italian region of Lombardy, located about  northeast of Milan and about  east of Bergamo.

Credaro borders the following municipalities: Capriolo, Castelli Calepio, Gandosso, Paratico, Trescore Balneario, Villongo, Zandobbio.

Demographic evolution

References